O Menino Maluquinho (The Nutty Boy) is a comic book and comic strip series created by Brazilian writer and cartoonist Ziraldo. It was based on the eponymous children's book published in 1980 which for many years was regarded as a classic of children's literature in Brazil, getting spun off into movies, plays and TV series. The comic books were published by Abril and Globo from 1989 until 2007. It was Ziraldo's second series of comic books, after "Turma do Pererê".

The main character, "Maluquinho" is a cheerful and optimistic 10-year-old boy who wears a pan on his head like a hat. Most of the stories revolve around the misadventures of Maluquinho and his friends with a light humour.

Characters 
 Maluquinho (literally Nutty) - The main character, an eccentric and smart boy, mischievous and troublemaking but good-hearted. He is always close to his friends Bocão and Junim, and is popular with girls (it is said in the book that he has 10 girlfriends, all at once), mainly Julieta. He often wears a cooking pot on his head as an improvised Napoleon's hat, an adult-sized blue jacket and brown dress shoes, both pieces looking quite oversized on him. Aside from that, his main attire is a yellow T-shirt, black shorts and white and sky blue sneakers.
 Julieta - Maluquinho's girlfriend. She's also a 10-year-old girl, sometimes considered a female version as "Menina Maluquinha" ("The Nutty Girl"). Julieta is cheerful, energetic, and talkative. She has a blue pet cat named Romeu (a reference to the Shakespearean tragedy Romeo and Juliet). She had her own comic that was released in 2004. She has long, black, frizzy hair, wears a red T-shirt with a lightning bolt design (very similar to Captain Marvel's symbol), pleated white skirt and red and white sneakers. In the Netflix series, she is Afro-Brazilian.
 Bocão (literally Gobber or Big Mouth) - One of Maluquinho's best friends, a chubby and glutton boy which often is always beside of Maluquinho in most of his plans and jokes. Usually he is ingenuous and is induced to the conversations of his friends. He has a little sister named Nina, that usually annoys him. He is a bit taller than the others and dresses all in blue.
 Junim (a corruption of Juninho, in turn an affectionate form of Junior) - Another one of Maluquinho's best friends, short in stature and with thick-rimmed glasses. Often gets stressed when his friends make fun of his little size. Like Maluquinho and Julieta, he also had his own comic that was released in 2007. Has blond hair which stands upright, wears a black-and-red striped shirt, blue pants and tennis shoes.
 Carolina "Carol" - Julieta's best friend. She is a vegetarian who cares about nature. She has black hair done in braided pigtails and wears a green dress.
 Herman - A bully and Maluquinho's rival. He is a tall strong boy who is jealous of Maluquinho for always being the center of attention and often threatens to beat him. Has strawberry blond hair and wears mainly a blue sweater with jogging pants in the same color.
 Lúcio - A friend of Maluquinho. He is the most intellectual kid in the class, always with a book in his hands. He is an African-Brazilian boy, usually wears a plaid shirt in the black and yellow colors.
 Sugiro Fernando - Another friend of Maluquinho. He is a Japanese-Brazilian boy who loves technology, computers and video games. He is usually seen with closed eyes, wears a red shirt and white pants, and has a buckteeth.
 Shirley Valéria - Julieta's frenemy. A rich girl who is always obsessed with fashion and fitness and always buy new clothes to attract the boys. She is blonde and is the only character to have blue eyes, usually wears a pink sleeveless shirt, blue gym pants, pink legwarmers and white-pink sneakers.

Titles 
The first time a comic was published was in 1989, initially under the title of "O Menino Maluquinho em Quadrinhos" (The Nutty Boy in Comics). In the last years of publication they have been sold titles starring Julieta and Junim. There were a total of 162 comic books have been published over the years.

Editora Abril
 O Menino Maluquinho (1989-1994) - 70 issues
 Revista do Menino Maluquinho (1994-1996) - 18 issues

Editora Terra
 O Menino Maluquinho (2000-2001) - 10 issues

Editora Globo
 O Menino Maluquinho (2004-2007) - 29 issues
 Julieta (2004-2007) - 29 issues
 Junim (2007) - 6 issues

Adaptations

Films 
In 1995  was released, directed by Helvécio Ratton, with a cast of Samuel Costa, Roberto Bomtempo, Patrícia Pillar, Othon Bastos and Luís Carlos Arutin (in his final film role). The movie follows Maluquinho's life with his friends and their pranks, dealing with his parents divorce and his relationship with his grandfather, that is a retired aviator who lives on a farm and dies at the end of the film.

The film had a sequel in 1998 titled , directed by Fernando Meirelles, with the same cast as the first film. In this movie Maluquinho tells his friends a story of another trip to his grandfather's house, where they discover a creature of fire called Tatá and become her friends.

In 2019 it was announced the production of an animated film based on the character by the studio Chatrone in partnership with Netflix.

TV series

Live action 
In 2006, the channel TVE Brasil (currently TV Brasil) produced a live-action sitcom called Um Menino Muito Maluquinho. This was the channel's second adaptation of Ziraldo's comics, following . The series, usually narrated by an adult, follows the life of Maluquinho and his friends, alternating between their early childhood (up to age 5) and his current age of 10. The show became popular, winning several awards and being broadcast on other channels— TV Cultura and Disney Channel— but did not have a second season.

Animated series 
In 2014, the production of an animated series based on the character was announced. In November 2021, it was revealed that Netflix will be distributing the show in selected territories.The series was released on October 12, 2022. New Episodes of the Netflix series are coming out in April 6, 2023.

Other books 
With the success of the comics, other books based on the character were written by Ziraldo over the years. These books started to use the characters created in the comics, such as Julieta, Bocão and Junim. Some of the published books were:

O Livro do Riso do Menino Maluquinho (November 20, 2000)
O Livro das Mágicas do Menino Maluquinho (2000)
A Panela do Menino Maluquinho (November 2007)
O Livro do Sim and O Livro do Não (April 30, 2009)
O Livro de Receitas do Menino Maluquinho (July 23, 2014)
Os Hai-Kais do Menino Maluquinho (2012)
O Livro dos Jogos, Brincadeiras e Bagunças do Menino Maluquinho (2014)
Eu, Eu, Eu e o Mar (August 2018) - Adaptation of one of the episodes of the TV series.
O Pior Amigo (August 2018) - Also an adaptation of one of the episodes of the TV series.

In 1996 Ziraldo also created a series of spin-off book series with the characters as babies entitled Bebê Maluquinho (Nutty Baby). Julieta's success in the comics published by Globo resulted in a book focused on the character entitled Uma Menina Chamada Julieta (A Girl Called Julieta) published in 2009.

Crossover with Monica's Gang 
In 2018, a book entitled MMMMM: Mônica e Menino Maluquinho na Montanha Mágica (Monica and Nutty Boy in the Magic Mountain), written by Manuel Filho with illustrations made by both Mauricio de Sousa and Ziraldo. The book marks the first official crossover between O Menino Maluquinho and Monica's Gang, two of the most popular comic book franchises in Brazil. The book's success spawned a sequel the following year entitled  5... 4... 3... 2... 1: Mônica e Menino Maluquinho Perdidos no Espaço (Monica and Nutty Boy Lost in Space), also written by Manuel Filho.

Reception and legacy 
When released the first title of the comic book by Abril in 1989 the magazine was awarded as "Best Release" in 1990 by Prêmio Angelo Agostini. In 2018 Maluquinho was chosen as the model for the trophy for the 30th edition of Troféu HQ Mix along with the character Monica.

References

External links 
 Official website (Portuguese)

1989 comics debuts
Brazilian comic strips
Brazilian comics titles
Brazilian comics adapted into films
Child characters in comics
Child characters in literature
Comics adapted into animated series
Fictional Brazilian people
Gag-a-day comics
Male characters in comics
Novels adapted into comics
Series of children's books